The Armed Man is a Mass by Welsh composer Karl Jenkins, subtitled "A Mass for Peace". The piece was commissioned by the Royal Armouries Museum for the Millennium celebrations, to mark the museum's move from London to Leeds, and it was dedicated to victims of the Kosovo crisis. Like Benjamin Britten's War Requiem before it, it is essentially an anti-war piece and is based on the Catholic Mass, which Jenkins combines with other sources, principally the 15th-century folk song "L'homme armé" in the first and last movements. It was written for SATB chorus with soloists (soprano and muezzin) and a symphonic orchestra. Guy Wilson, then master of the museum, selected the texts for the mass.

Overview
In addition to extracts from the Ordinary of the Mass, the text incorporates words from other religious and historical sources, including the Islamic call to prayer, the Bible (e.g., the Psalms and Revelation) and the Mahabharata. Writers whose words appear in the work include Rudyard Kipling, Alfred Lord Tennyson and Sankichi Toge, who survived the Hiroshima bombing but died some years later of leukaemia.

The Armed Man charts the growing menace of a descent into war, interspersed with moments of reflection; shows the horrors that war brings; and ends with the hope for peace in a new millennium, when "sorrow, pain and death can be overcome". It begins with a representation of marching feet, overlaid later by the shrill tones of a piccolo impersonating the flutes of a military band with the 15th-century French words of "The Armed Man". After the reflective pause of the Call to Prayer and the Kyrie, "Save Us From Bloody Men" appeals for God's help against our enemies in words from the Book of Psalms (Psalm 59). The Sanctus has a military, menacing air, followed by Kipling's "Hymn Before Action". "Charge!" draws on words from John Dryden's "A song for St. Cecilia's day" (1687) and Jonathan Swift citing Horace (Odes 3,2,13), beginning with martial trumpets and song, but ending in the agonised screams of the dying. This is followed by the eerie silence of the battlefield after action, broken by a lone trumpet playing the Last Post. "Angry Flames" describes the appalling scenes after the bombing of Hiroshima, and "Torches" parallels this with an excerpt from the Mahabharata (book 1, chapter 228), describing the terror and suffering of animals dying in the burning of the Khandava Forest. Agnus Dei is followed by "Now the Guns have Stopped", written by Guy Wilson himself as part of a Royal Armouries display on the guilt felt by some returning survivors of World War I.  After the Benedictus, "Better is Peace" ends the mass on a note of hope, drawing on the hard-won understanding of Lancelot and Guinevere that peace is better than war, on Tennyson's poem "Ring Out, Wild Bells" and on the text from : "God shall wipe away all tears".

Derived works 
In 2002, Boosey & Hawkes published a chorale suite with excerpts from the work for choir and orchestra (or organ), containing Kyrie, Sanctus, Benedictus, Agnus Dei and "Hymn before Action". Jenkins wrote an Agnus Dei setting for choir a cappella based on the material from the Agnus Dei from the mass, basically assigning the chords of the accompaniment to divided male voices.

Performances
The Armed Man: A Mass For Peace was premiered at The Royal Albert Hall, London, on 25 April 2000, performed by The National Youth Choir of Great Britain and the National Musicians Symphony Orchestra with Julian Lloyd Webber as the cello soloist, and conducted by Grant Llewellyn.

The piece is one of Jenkins' most popular works, and is regularly performed by professional and amateur musicians. By March 2008 it had already seen 537 performances worldwide. Of the 348 UK performances, the majority were by nonprofessionals.

Recordings

The first CD release was recorded at Air Studios during summer of 2000 by The London Philharmonic Orchestra conducted by Karl Jenkins and The National Youth Choir of Great Britain conducted by Mike Brewer, and released on the Virgin label on September 10, 2001.

Track listing
"The Armed Man" – 6:25
"The Call to Prayers (Adhaan)" – 2:04
"Kyrie" – 8:12
"Save Me from Bloody Men" – 1:42
"Sanctus" – 7:00
"Hymn Before Action" – 2:38
"Charge!" – 7:26
"Angry Flames" – 4:44
"Torches" – 2:58
"Agnus Dei" – 3:39
"Now the Guns Have Stopped" – 3:25
"Benedictus" – 7:36
"Better Is Peace" – 9:33

In October 2010, a special edition re-release of the album added a 14th track, and was packaged with a bonus DVD of a live performance of the work:

14. "For The Fallen: In Memoriam Alfryn Jenkins" – 4:41

Personnel
London Philharmonic Orchestra
Karl Jenkins – conductor
National Youth Choir of Great Britain
Mohammed Gad – muezzin
Guy Johnston – cello
Tristan Hambleton – treble vocals
Jody K Jenkins – additional percussion
Dave Hassell – additional percussion
Neil Percy – additional percussion

Links with other works by Karl Jenkins
The track "Sanctus" shares its theme with the Adiemus piece "Immrama" which was introduced on the album set More Journey: Adiemus New Best & Live. "Benedictus" borrows its theme from "The Eternal Knot" from Adiemus IV: The Eternal Knot.

Other media
There are two films made to accompany live performances of The Armed Man:

1. The Armed Man Film was created by film maker and director Hefin Owen, and was premiered in its current form in Johannesburg, South Africa in September 2007 with Karl Jenkins conducting. "The film echoes and traces the story as told in the text of the work; the build up to conflict, conflict itself and the aftermath, finally looking forward to a better future," says Karl Jenkins.

2. The Armed Boy, an original film that was created exclusively to accompany live performances of The Armed Man, premiered in March 2007. The story of the film revolves around a young boy who suffers under the merciless hands of a bully and his gang. When he finally retaliates, he learns the greater consequences of taking up arms—an allegorical representation of Jenkins’ call for peace in times of war. Created by Robert Cucuzza and Thomas Cucuzza, the film was designed to correspond harmoniously with the theme and tone of each individual piece and the footage was edited in precise synchronicity with Jenkins’ music. The Armed Boy was commissioned by Rackham Symphony Choir and premiered in Detroit, Michigan on March 25, 2007. In January 2008, the filmmakers were presented with a Peace Award at the Ninth Annual World Sabbath of Religious Reconciliation for their work on the film.

Instrumentation
The mass is scored for a large symphony orchestra with extensive percussion.

 Piccolo
 2 flutes (both doubling piccolo)
 2 oboes
 Cor anglais
 2 clarinets in B
 Bass clarinet in B
 2 bassoons
 Contrabassoon
 4 horns in F
 4 trumpets in B
 3 trombones
 Tuba
 Timpani
 Solo cello in 12th movement - 'Benedictus'
 Strings

and 5 percussionists playing:

 3 snare drums
 Field drum
 4 tom-toms
 Surdo
 Floor toms
 Cymbals
 2 bass drums
 Chekere
 Congas
 Drum kit
 Tam-tam
 Triangle
 Taiko drum
 Wind chimes
 Mark tree
 Low "D" (tubular) bell
 Tenor drum
 Tambourine
 Tambourim
 Tubular bells

References

External links
The Armed Man: A Mass For Peace Schott
Karl Jenkins
Adiemus Unofficial Home Page
The Armed Boy film @ thearmedboy.com 
The Armed Boy Film Project @ Rackhamchoir.org
The Armed Man Film

Compositions by Karl Jenkins
1999 compositions
2000 compositions
2001 classical albums
Karl Jenkins albums
Masses (music)